Cesar Chavez (born Scott Michael Fistler on December 20, 1979) is an American perennial candidate from Arizona known for his multiple campaigns for a seat on Arizona's 7th congressional district.

Chavez officially changed political parties from Republican to Democrat on April 28, 2014.

Politics

2012 campaign
In 2012, Chavez mounted a campaign as a Republican write-in candidate against Democrat Ed Pastor for the District 7 seat.  Incumbent Pastor was challenged by Democrat Rebecca Witt in the August 2012 primary for the 7th Congressional District, but Pastor "easily bested" Witt. Chavez ran as the only Republican candidate.

In that election, Pastor was elected to a 12th term in congress, "easily" winning the election. With Chavez mounting the write-in campaign, he was not listed as the official Republican in election result announcements.

2013 campaign
In 2013, Chavez ran for the Phoenix City Council District 4 seat. "Longtime" councilman Tom Simplot  announced that he would not seek reelection for the 2013 election, which resulted in more candidates running for one City Council seat than any other district in the United States that election. Candidates included Chavez, then running under Scott Fistler; Jeffrey Brown; Dan Carroll; Austin Head; Justin Johnson, son of former Phoenix Mayor Paul Johnson; David Lujan; and Laura Pastor, daughter of Ed Pastor.

At the time, Chavez had lived in Phoenix eight years. On the official City Council candidate form, Chavez listed his favorite book as The Sneetches by Dr. Seuss and his favorite movie as Rocky.

Early results showed Kate Gallego and Laura Pastor leading the polls. Eventually, Pastor won Simplot's seat and Gallego won Councilman Michael Johnson's seat after he termed out after 12 years in office.

Chavez' bid for the City Council seat was unsuccessful, with Pastor, Gallego and then incumbents Jim Waring (District 2) and Sal DiCiccio (District 6) comprising the council.

2014 campaign
In 2014, Chavez again ran for a seat on Arizona's 7th congressional district. On June 17, 2014, Maricopa County Superior Court Judge John Rea ruled that Chavez was ineligible to run based on the signatures being invalid. Chavez represented himself in court and stated that he would appeal the ruling. He also appealed to voters to "funnel money" to him and to find him an attorney. The Arizona secretary of state's office stated that almost half (just under 700) of the signatures were invalid.

Chavez's 2014 campaign website was hosted on Blogspot.

2016 campaign
Chavez tried to run again in 2016, asking the Arizona Democratic Party to list him as a candidate on the ballot. They refused, stating that he was not a serious candidate. They also received a court order to keep Chavez from harassing them, stating that he threatened them. In response, Chavez stated, "This is a slap in the face for not only veterans in America, but for veteran families, immigrants, everybody because we should want to go to the polls and vote."

Name change
Chavez changed his name from Scott Fistler to Cesar Chavez in December 2013. He was criticized for changing his name and switching political parties to try to gain Hispanic votes in District 7, which is heavily Hispanic. Chavez rebutted those accusations, saying the change was to get a shorter and easier-to-pronounce name, and that he was inspired by a dog food brand. The official reason Chavez listed for changing his name on court paperwork was that he "had experienced many hardships because of his name". Chavez paid the regular court filing fee of $319 for the name change.

References

Politicians from Phoenix, Arizona
Arizona Republicans
Arizona Democrats
Place of birth missing (living people)
Living people
1979 births